"Never Know" is a song by American rock band Bad Omens. It a single from the deluxe edition of their second studio album, Finding God Before God Finds Me. It peaked at number 25 on the Billboard Mainstream Rock Songs chart in August 2021.

Background
In August 2019, Bad Omens released their second studio album, Finding God Before God Finds Me. In December 2019, the band announced they would be releasing a deluxe edition of the album in January 2020 with three additional tracks; the track "Never Know" would be one of those three tracks. The original version of the song was released in December 2019 at the time of the announcement. When the COVID-19 pandemic halted plans for the band to tour in support of the album, the band decided to spend the time creating alternate versions of their songs, including "Never Know". In October 2020, the band released an acoustic recording of the song, along with an accompanying performance video. Later in June 2021, a live version of the song was released as well, again with a music video. In 2021, it was released to US rock radio as a single, and in August 2021, it peaked at number 21 on the Billboard Mainstream Rock Songs chart; the second highest of their career, behind "Limits".

Themes and composition
Frontman Noah Sebastian noted that the song was part of the band's efforts to "show that you can make empowering, happy, positive music without it being cheesy or corny" and that it was witten on an effort to "convey [his] experiences and feelings in a way that people could sing along and just feel in control and powerful."

Personnel
Band

 Noah Sebastian – lead vocals
 Joakim Karlsson – guitar 
 Nicholas Ruffilo – bass, guitar 
 Nick Folio – drums

Charts

References

2021 singles